Matthew Lane (born 8 August 1968) is a New Zealand professional  golfer.

Competitive golf career 
Lane was born in Wellington. He attended the University of Oklahoma in the United States on a golf scholarship from 1986 to 1990 and was a member of the winning team at the 1989 NCAA Division I Men's Golf Championships.  He earned All-American honors three years while at the University of Oklahoma.

Following college, Lane turned pro and began a career playing on the Asian Tour, PGA Tour of Australasia, Canadian Tour, European Tour and Nationwide Tour.

Lane's career culminated with a win at the 1998 New Zealand Open championship, which was held at Formosa Golf Resort.  Without playing privileges on any of the major professional golf tours, he did not intend on attending the New Zealand Open that year.  It was only after his father paid for his airfair to travel to New Zealand that Lane decided to attend.  He was forced to Monday qualify for the tournament and after successfully doing so went on to shoot rounds of 72, 69, 74, 64 for a -9 total of 279.  The final round 64 was the low round of the tournament and he beat Australian Rod Pampling by 3 strokes.

Life after golf 
Lane's golf career was hindered by poor eyesight.  Over the years he has had two cornea transplant surgeries, one of which was so bad it forced him to stop playing competitive professional golf in 2001.

Lane currently resides in Agoura Hills, California where he teaches golf at the Lindero Country Club.  He is married to Terri and they have two children; Ashley and Nicolas.

Professional wins (1)

PGA Tour of Australasia wins (1)

References

External links 

New Zealand male golfers
Oklahoma Sooners men's golfers
PGA Tour of Australasia golfers
PGA Tour golfers
Sportspeople from Wellington City
1968 births
Living people